John Francis Barthold (April 14, 1882 – November 4, 1946), nicknamed "Hans", was an American Major League Baseball pitcher. He played for the Philadelphia Athletics for one season.

References

Major League Baseball pitchers
Philadelphia Athletics players
Baseball players from Pennsylvania
1882 births
1946 deaths
Minor league baseball managers
Lancaster Red Roses players
Wilmington Peaches players
Reading Pretzels players
Harrisburg Senators players
Peterborough Whitecaps players